Sugarloaf is a  peak in west Wicklow, Ireland that lies on the northern edge of the Glen of Imaal.  With a prominence of only , it is not listed in any of the recognised categories of mountains in Ireland, and is a subsidiary summit of Lobawn , to the north.

Sugarloaf should not be confused with the better known Great Sugar Loaf , and the Little Sugar Loaf  in the northeastern section of the Wicklow Mountains.


Bibliography

See also

Wicklow Way
Wicklow Mountains
Lists of mountains in Ireland
List of mountains of the British Isles by height
List of Hewitt mountains in England, Wales and Ireland

References

External links
MountainViews: The Irish Mountain Website, Sugarloaf (West Wicklow)
MountainViews: Irish Online Mountain Database
The Database of British and Irish Hills , the largest database of British Isles mountains ("DoBIH")
Hill Bagging UK & Ireland, the searchable interface for the DoBIH

Mountains and hills of County Wicklow
Geography of County Wicklow